The 2022 Canadian Country Music Awards, honouring achievements in Canadian country music, were presented on September 11, 2022 at the Scotiabank Saddledome in Calgary, Alberta, and broadcast by the Global Television Network. The ceremony was hosted by Tenille Townes and Blanco Brown.

Nominees were announced on July 20. A week later, the Canadian Country Music Association revised the nominations to add several more nominees in various categories, noting tabulation errors caused by the increasingly fragmented release strategies used by the modern music industry.

Nominees and winners

Music

Radio

Industry

References

Canadian Country Music
Canadian Country Music
2022